Ham sausage is a sausage prepared using ham and other ingredients, the latter varying by location. It is a part of the cuisines of China, Germany, Poland and the United States. Ham sausage is a mass-produced food product.

By country

China

Autoclaved ham sausage is branded as "Ham Sausage" in China. Ham sausage is mass-produced and consumed in China, and several varieties of the product exist in the country. The Chinese ham sausage is a mixture of meat and starch, as well as low concentrations of water, vegetable oil, salt, monosodium glutamate and other food additives. A very small amount of ham sausage produced in China is exported to Japan (around .02% in 2004). The Chundu Group is an example of a Chinese company that produces ham sausage.

Germany

In German cuisine, ham sausage (Schinkenwurst) is made from ham mixed with varying amounts of bacon, ground pork, beef, meat trimmings, garlic, and spices. The mixture is stuffed into casings, can be smoked, and is cooked in scalding or boiling water. Ham sausage can be cured using a curing solution that is rubbed into the ham, and machines can perform this process. Ham sausage has a marbled appearance due to the ham and bacon pieces in it, which can be observed when the product is sliced. German ham sausage can be sliced and then grilled or fried, and is also used as an ingredient in soups and stews.

Italy
Soppressata is an Italian dry-cured salami that is sometimes prepared using ham.

Poland
Kielbasa szynkowa is a Polish ham sausage prepared using ham, pork shoulder, beef and spices. It can be prepared by hot smoking.

United States
The Christian Klinck Packing Company, established around 1868 in Buffalo, New York, by German immigrants, sold a ham sausage and other sausage products by 1905. During the 1910s the Edelweiss brand included ham sausage in its product line. In the late 1800s in the U.S., Parisian ham sausage was prepared using pork ham or shoulder, beef and spices. Parisian ham sausage at this time was smoked and then boiled.

Smithfield Foods, an American meat processing company, introduced ham sausage as part of its product line in the late 1970s.

New England ham sausage, also referred to as pressed ham, is prepared using ham or pork shoulder trimmings, and lean pork that is ground, smoked and then boiled.

Mass production
Ham sausage is a mass-produced food. The Tai Foong Canned Goods Co. in Shanghai, China, produced and purveyed canned corned ham sausage and canned smoked ham sausage as early as 1915. The Tianjin Meat United Processing Factory in Tianjin, China, produces Yingbin brand ham sausage in contemporary times. G.A. Müller and Könecke are German companies that produce a ham sausage called Schinken Bockwurst (English: ham bockwurst) and other sausage products in contemporary times. Smithfield Foods of the U.S. has mass-produced ham sausage.

See also

 List of sausages
 Teewurst – a German sausage prepared using pork, bacon and sometimes beef

Notes

References

Further reading
 
 
 
 
 

Chinese cuisine
German cuisine
Ham dishes
Polish cuisine
Sausages
American sausages
American pork dishes